Istigobius is a genus of gobies found in fresh, brackish and marine waters of the regions along the coasts of the Indian and western Pacific oceans.

Species
There are currently 10 recognized species in this genus:
 Istigobius campbelli (D. S. Jordan & Snyder, 1901)
 Istigobius decoratus (Herre, 1927) (Decorated goby)
 Istigobius diadema (Steindachner, 1876) (Spectacled sandgoby )
 Istigobius goldmanni (Bleeker, 1852) (Goldman's goby)
 Istigobius hoesei Murdy & McEachran, 1982
 Istigobius hoshinonis (S. Tanaka (I), 1917)
 Istigobius nigroocellatus (Günther, 1873) (Black-spotted goby)
 Istigobius ornatus (Rüppell, 1830) (Ornate goby)
 Istigobius rigilius (Herre, 1953) (Rigilius goby)
 Istigobius spence (J. L. B. Smith, 1947) (Pearl goby)

References

Gobiidae